Marvin's Room may refer to:
 "Marvins Room", a song by Drake from the album Take Care
 Marvin's Room (play), by Scott McPherson
 Marvin's Room (film), 1996 adaptation of the play, directed by Jerry Zaks
 Marvin's Room (studio), formerly Marvin Gaye Studios
 Marvin's Room (radio show), a Canadian radio show devoted to rhythm and blues music
 "Marvin's Room", a song by Lil Wayne from the mixtape Sorry 4 the Wait